The Senne is a natural region in the Regierungsbezirk of Detmold, in the state of Nordrhein-Westfalen in west-central Germany. It lies between the cities of Bielefeld to the north-west, Detmold to the north-east, and Paderborn to the south.

Heath, calcareous grassland, and moorland cover most of the area. The river Ems arises here. Flora and fauna are very rich in the Senne, 901 of the 5000 animal and plant species are listed on the IUCN Red List.

116 km2 of the Senne and therefore more than the half of it area are taken by the Sennelager Training Area, which is mainly used by British forces. By 2020 all of the planned reductions in British forces had been completed, which now leaves the future of this landscape undecided.

Fauna 

The region is the home of a criticallyendangered breed of riding horse, the Senner, which is believed to be the oldest breed of riding horse in Germany, and is documented at least as far back as 1160. It lived in feral herds in the moorlands and in the Teutoburger Forest to the east. In 1999, some were introduced to the  nature reserve to assist in conservation grazing.

References

North Rhine-Westphalia
Natural regions of Germany